This is a list of University of Southampton people, including famous officers, staff (past and present) and student alumni from the University of Southampton or historical institutions from which the current university derives.

Officers

Chancellors

Hartley Institution and Hartley College
Chancellors were known as principals before the formation of University College
1862–1873 Francis Bond
1873–1874 Charles Blackader
1875–1895 Thomas Shore
1896–1900 R. Stewart
1900–1902 Spencer Richardson

University College
Chancellors were known as presidents before the formation of university
1902–1907 Arthur Wellesley, 4th Duke of Wellington
1908–1908 Sir Alfred Wills
1910–1913 Claude Montefiore (Acting President)
1913–1934 Claude Montefiore
1934–1947 Lord John Seely
1948–1949 Lord Wyndham Portal
1949–1953 Gerald Wellesley, 7th Duke of Wellington

University 
1952–1962 Gerald Wellesley, 7th Duke of Wellington
1964–1974 Lord Keith Murray
1974–1984 Lord Eric Roll
1984–1995 Earl George Jellicoe
1996–2006 John Palmer, 4th Earl of Selborne
2006–2011 Sir John Parker
2011–2017 Dame Helen Alexander
2019–present Ruby Wax

Vice-chancellors

University College
Vice-chancellors were known as principals before the formation of University
1902–1912 Spencer Richardson
1912–1920 Alexander Hill
1920–1922 Thomas Tudor Loveday
1922–1946 Kenneth Hotham Vickers
1946–1952 Sir Robert Stanford Wood

University
1952–1952 Sir Robert Stanford Wood
1952–1965 David Gwilym James
1965–1971 Kenneth Mather
1971–1979 Laurence Gower
1979–1985 John Roberts, CBE
1985–1994 Sir Gordon Higginson
1994–2001 Sir Howard Newby
2001–2009 Sir William Wakeham
2009–2015 Don Nutbeam
2015–2019 Sir Christopher Snowden
2019–present Mark E. Smith

Other 
Selected past and current pro-chancellors

Sir Henry Tizard
Sir Samuel Gurney-Dixon
Sir Basil Schonland
Sir Bernard Miller
Lord Edward Shackleton
Sir Adrian Swire
 Dame Rennie Fritchie
 Dame Yvonne Moores
 William Darwin, first-born son of Charles Darwin; treasurer of the Hartley Institution

Staff
Current and former notable members of academic staff by subject field:

Arts

Sciences

Chemistry

Electronics and computer science

Mathematics

Ocean and earth science 
 George Deacon, awarded the Royal Medal of the Royal Society for contributions to physical oceanography and leadership as director of the National Institute of Oceanography

Physics and astronomy 
Dame Jocelyn Bell Burnell, President of the Institute of Physics
Sir David Wallace, Director of the Isaac Newton Institute for Mathematical Sciences in Cambridge and master of Churchill College, Cambridge
Anna Watts, astrophysicist and Professor at University of Amsterdam

Engineering
 Wing Commander Thomas Reginald Cave-Browne-Cave elder brother of Air Vice Marshal Henry Cave-Browne-Cave; both engineering officers in the Royal Naval Air Service during World War I
 Sir Peter Gregson, Vice Chancellor of Cranfield University, former President and Vice-Chancellor of Queen's University Belfast

Medicine

Nursing and midwifery
Dame Jill Macleod Clark, President of the Infection Control Nursing Association
Dame Jessica Corner, Dean (since 2010) of the Faculty of Health Sciences; Professor (since 2008) of Cancer and Palliative Care at the University of Southampton

Social sciences

Geography 
 Florence Clark Miller, lecturer in Geography from 1921 and head of the Geography Department from 1949
 Sir Paul Curran, current Vice-Chancellor of City University London; former Vice-Chancellor of Bournemouth University; recipient of the Patron's Medal of the Royal Geographical Society

History

Law 
 Malcolm Grant, Provost and President of University College London
 Alastair Hudson, Professor of Equity and Finance Law
Dame Judith Mayhew, former Provost of King's College, Cambridge; on the Board of Directors at Merrill Lynch
 Albie Sachs, former Judge of the Constitutional Court of South Africa

Students 

Former notable students at Southampton include:

Academia 
 Jackie Akhavan, chemist, Fellow of the Royal Society of Chemistry and head of the Centre for Defence Chemistry at Cranfield University
 Richard Aldridge, former President of the Palaeontological Association
 Joanna Bauldreay, British chemist and Aviation Fuel Development Manager at Shell Global Solutions
 Anthony Cohen CBE, Vice-Chancellor of Queen Margaret University, Edinburgh
Sir Christopher Ingold, chemist, recipient of the Longstaff Medal of the Royal Society of Chemistry in 1951 and the Royal Medal of the Royal Society in 1952
David Jones, Flavelle Medal–winning biologist
Sir Harold Marshall, acoustician, Knight of the New Zealand Order of Merit, Fellow of the Royal Society of New Zealand, awarded Wallace Clement Sabine Medal in 1995 and Rayleigh Medal in 2015
 Phil Moorby, computer scientist and recipient of the Phil Kaufman Award
 Antony Sutton, economist who published on controversial topics such as the West's role in developing Soviet Union, Wall Street's involvement in the Russian Revolution and the rise of Adolf Hitler and the University of Yale's Skull and Bones Society
 Adrian Tinniswood, author, historian and educationalist
 Nigel Weatherill, engineer, Vice-Chancellor and Chief Executive of Liverpool John Moores University 
 Colin White, historian and Director of the Royal Naval Museum
 Ashraf El-Shihy, former Minister of Higher Education, Minister of Scientific Research, and a University President/Chancellor in Egypt.
 Christine Patch, nurse and genetic counsellor, Clinical Lead for Genetic Counselling at Genomics England and former President of the European Society of Human Genetics

Arts 

 Ritu Arya, actress best known for her role in The Umbrella Academy
 Darren Almond, artist working in film, installation, sculpture and photography; nominated for the 2005 Turner Prize
 Stephen Baxter, award-winning science fiction author
 Stephen Baysted, composer of video game soundtracks
 Martin Bell, poet and founder member of The Group
 John Buckley, sculptor, creator of the Headington Shark
 James Castle, draughtsman and sculptor; Invited Artist at Royal West of England Academy
 Daniel Catán, composer of Florencia en el Amazonas
 Ronald Cavaye, pianist and music author
 James Clarke, composer of Voices in collaboration with Harold Pinter
 Stephen Deuchar, Director of Tate Britain
 Brian Eno, electronic music pioneer, recording artist and producer
Kodwo Eshun a British-Ghanaian writer, theorist and filmmaker.
 Aaron Fletcher, musician in The Bees
 Anne Hardy, artist best known for her large-scale photographic work of unusual interior spaces
 Jeremy Hardy, winner of the Perrier Comedy Award in 1988
 Mark Hill, record producer; member of Artful Dodger band
 Mick Jackson, director of L.A. Story and Volcano
 Stephen Jeffreys, playwright of The Libertine
 Edward Kluz, artist, illustrator and printmaker
 Marek Larwood, comedian in BBC Three sitcom Rush Hour
 Paul Lee, sculptor
 Robin Maconie, composer, pianist, and writer
 Dominic Muldowney, composer and former music director of the Royal National Theatre
 John Nettles, actor best known for playing the main roles in Bergerac and Midsomer Murders
 James Saunders, playwright and writer of BBC sitcom Bloomers
 Rosemary Squire, co-founder and Executive Director of the Ambassador Theatre Group
 Pauline Stainer, poet
 Linda Sutton, artist and regular exhibitor at the Royal Academy of Arts Summer Exhibition
 Antony G. Sweeney, former director of the Australian Centre for the Moving Image

Business 

 George Buckley, Chairman, President, and Chief Executive of 3M
 Richard Cuthbertson, Research Director of the Oxford Institute of Retail Management, Oxford University
 Tom Delay CBE, climate economist and Chief Executive of the Carbon Trust.
 Chris Hohn, founder of The Children's Investment Fund Management; Britain's biggest charity donor
Hosein Khajeh-Hosseiny, founder of OpenX Innovations, trustee of The Brookings Institution
 Frederick Lanchester, co-founder of the Lanchester Motor Company
 Andrew MacLeod, Non-Executive Director of Cornerstone Capital and Homestrings PLC; former humanitarian lawyer and aid worker
 Richard Murphy, accountant and tax campaigner
 Christopher Orlebar, former British Airways Concorde pilot
 Chai Patel CBE, former Chief Executive of the Priory Healthcare group
 Stephen Payne OBE, maritime consultant and former Vice-President and Chief Naval Architect at Carnival Corporation (owners of Cunard)
 Stuart Popham, senior partner at Clifford Chance
 Peter Tertzakian, Chief Energy Economist of ARC Financial Corporation
 Justin Urquhart Stewart, Co-founder of 7IM, investment company and well known Business commentator. University has a bursary award named after him.

Politics and public life 

 Baroness Liz Barker, Liberal Democrat Life Peer
 Conor Burns, Member of Parliament for Bournemouth West
 Grenville Cross, Director of Public Prosecutions of Hong Kong, China
 John Denham, Labour Member of Parliament for Southampton Itchen; Secretary of State for Innovation, Universities and Skills
 Evan Enwerem, former president of the Senate of Nigeria
 Mohammed Lutfi Farhat, Member of the Pan-African Parliament from Libya; the Parliament's North African Vice President
 Astrid Fischel Volio, Vice-President of Costa Rica
Sir Adrian Fulford, Judge of the International Criminal Court
 Justine Greening, Conservative Member of Parliament for Putney; Former Secretary of State for Education and Minister for Women and Equalities
 Karl-Theodor zu Guttenberg, former German Minister of Defence
Baroness Gloria Hooper, lawyer and Life peer in the House of Lords
 Rima Horton, Labour Party councillor on the Kensington and Chelsea London Borough Council from 1986 to 2006.
 Gerald Howarth, Conservative Member of Parliament for Aldershot; Shadow Minister for Secretary of State for Defence
 Jason Hu, Mayor of Taichung City and former foreign minister of the Republic of China
 David Kurten, UKIP Member of the London Assembly
 Usutuaije Maamberua, Namibian politician, head of the South West Africa National Union
 Glyn Mathias, former Electoral Commissioner of the United Kingdom
 Bob Mitchell, former Labour Member of Parliament for Southampton Test; Social Democratic Party Member of Parliament for Southampton Itchen
 Peter Price, honorary Member of the European Parliament; member of the European Strategy Council
 Geoffrey Rowland, Bailiff of Guernsey
 Arnold Shaw, former Labour Member of Parliament for Ilford South
Viscount Jan David Simon, Labour Member of the House of Lords
Lord Clive Soley, Labour Member of the House of Lords
Sir John Stevens, former head of the Metropolitan Police Service; current international security advisor to the prime minister
 Matthew Taylor, chief executive of the Royal Society of Arts
Lord George Thomas, former Speaker of the House of Commons; Labour Member of Parliament for Cardiff Central and Cardiff West
 Richard Thomas, Information Commissioner and former director of public policy at Clifford Chance law firm
 Melchior Wathelet Jr., former Belgian Minister of the Interior
 Alan Whitehead, Labour Member of Parliament for Southampton Test
 William Whitlock, former Labour Member of Parliament for Nottingham North
 Sheila Wright, former Labour Member of Parliament for Birmingham Handsworth

Media 

 Laura Bailey, model and fashion writer
 Liz Barker, former Blue Peter presenter
 Andrea Benfield, co-anchor of Wales Tonight
 Alex Brummer, financial commentator; City Editor for The Mail on Sunday and the Daily Mail newspapers
 Stefan Buczacki, horticulturalist, radio and TV expert
 William Frank Kobina Coleman, Director General of the Ghana Broadcasting Corporation (1960–1970)
 Jason Cowley, editor for the New Statesman magazine
 David Cracknell, former Political Editor for the Sunday Times newspaper
 Jon Craig, Chief Political Correspondent for Sky News
 John Inverdale, sports broadcaster for the BBC
 Glyn Mathias, Political Editor of Independent Television News (1981-1986) and BBC Wales (1994-1999); the Electoral Commission's Commissioner for Wales (2001-2008); board member of OFCOM (2011–present) 
 Dominic Mohan, editor of the newspaper The Sun
 Chris Packham, naturalist and television presenter for Inside Out in the South
 Daniel Sandford, Home Affairs Correspondent for the BBC
 Jon Sopel, presenter of The Politics Show; a lead presenter on BBC News 24
 Kathy Tayler, former presenter of Holiday on the BBC
 Stella Tennant, modeled for Chanel, Calvin Klein, Hermès and Burberry
 Srđa Trifković, foreign affairs editor for the Chronicles magazine and director of the Center for International Affairs at the Rockford Institute
 Caroline Wyatt, Religious correspondent for the BBC

Military 
Air Vice Marshal Arthur Button OBE, former Senior Commander in the Royal Air Force
Admiral Tony Radakin, First Sea Lord, appointed as Chief of the Defence Staff
Air Commodore Ian Stewart, Commandant of the Air Cadet Organisation
Admiral Sir George Zambellas, First Sea Lord; awarded the Distinguished Service Cross in 2000

Religion 
 Anjem Choudary, Muslim preacher
 David Hallatt, former Bishop of Shrewsbury
 Lee Rayfield, Bishop of Swindon
 Tim Thornton, Bishop of Truro

Sport 

 Guin Batten, won silver at the 2000 Summer Olympics in the quadruple scull; set the record for the fastest solo crossing of the English Channel in a rowing shell
 Miriam Batten, won silver at the 2000 Summer Olympics in the quadruple scull
 Roger Black; 400m athlete; European, Commonwealth and World Championship gold medalist
 Pavlos Kontides, sailor; won silver medal at the 2012 Summer Olympics in the Men's Laser class
 Tim Male, rower in the 2004 Summer Olympics
 Adrian Newey, Technical Director, Red Bull Racing Formula One team
 Jon Potter, member of the gold-winning British field hockey squad at the 1988 Summer Olympics and bronze winning squad at the 1984 Summer Olympics
 John Smith, former Pro-Bowl placekicker for the New England Patriots of the NFL
 Harry Tarraway, Olympian at the 1948 Olympic Games
 Mark Taylor, former captain of Wales national rugby union team
 Robert Tobin, part of the silver medal-winning 4×400 relay team at the 2009 World Athletic Championships in Berlin
 Bruce Tulloh, 5000m athlete; won gold medal at the 1962 European Championships in bare feet
 Lawrence Wallace, medal winner at the 1938 Empire Games
 Rob White, deputy managing director engine at Renault F1
Daniel Wright, referee at the 2008 European Lacrosse Championship and 2010 World Lacrosse Championship

Other 
T. Q. Armar, Ghanaian publisher
 Kevin Ashman, international Mastermind champion
 Sally Clark, lawyer, convicted for the murder of her two children in 1999, subsequently quashed on appeal in 2003; notable for the involvement of Sir Roy Meadow and Munchausen Syndrome by Proxy
 Katy Croff Bell, National Geographic Explorer
 George Hersee, BBC engineer responsible for development of Test Card F
 June Jolly, children's nurse
 Scott Mills, Radio One DJ; involved with Southampton University's radio station, Surge, although never a student at the University
Gerry del-Guercio, Richard Hanson, Neil Higton, John Maskell and Alexei Roszkowiak, members of indie rock band SixNationState, formed whilst studying sociology at Southampton
 Jeremy Stangroom, writer, editor, and website designer
 Christopher Stark, British radio personality known for his work as a co-host on the Scott Mills show on BBC Radio 1.
 Jane Wilson-Howarth author

Fictional characters 
 Alice Aldridge, character in The Archers, studying for an aeronautical engineering degree

References 

 
Southampton
Southampton-related lists